The Mausoleum of Khoja Mashkhad is located 6 km south of Shaartuz in the Khatlon province of Tajikistan.

Site description
The mausoleum is a rare example of a pre-Mongol madrasah from the 11th and 12th centuries.  Two large, domed structures are connected at the middle by a small arch, constructed of mud-brick.  Due to the building materials used, the structure is prone to decay and is in need of conservation.

World Heritage Status
This site was added to the UNESCO World Heritage Tentative List on November 9, 1999, in the Cultural category.

Notes

References
 Mausoleum of "Khoja Mashkhad" - UNESCO World Heritage Centre Retrieved 2009-03-04.

Religion in Central Asia
Tajikistani culture
Mausoleums in Tajikistan